The 1944 Greek naval mutiny was a mutiny by sailors on five ships of the Royal Hellenic Navy in April 1944 over the composition of the Greek government-in-exile, in support of the National Liberation Front (EAM). Petros Voulgaris was called from retirement and appointed vice-admiral to quell the revolt.

The revolt began in Alexandria. Sailors Revolutionary Commissions were formed both on ships and the naval shore establishments on 4 April 1944.

The 1st Brigade of the Greek Armed Forces in the Middle East also suffered a EAM-inspired mutiny on 6 April 1944.

The American philosopher James Burnham, writing in the Partisan Review, saw the mutiny as the start of a "Third World War" as the start of a geopolitical confrontation between the Western Allies and Soviet communism.

Ships involved
 Greek corvette Apostolis
 Greek corvette Sachtouris
 Greek destroyer Kriti
 
 Greek destroyer Pindos

References

Further reading

1944 in Egypt
1944 in Greece
Conflicts in 1944
April 1944 events
20th-century rebellions
20th century in Alexandria
Naval mutinies
Greece in World War II
History of the Hellenic Navy
Mutinies in World War II
Rebellions in Egypt
Rebellions in Greece